Philippe Bogaert (Uccle, Belgium, 1971).  Philippe Bogaert is a marketing strategist specialised in corporate communication and digital lead generation.

Bogaert was famous in 2009 in the media for advertising himself on social media platforms and international TV stations to be kept "hostage" in Qatar.

In September 2009, Bogaert managed to escape Qatar by sailboat and fled to Europe, where he arrived by the second half of September 2009. He is now reunited with his family.

In May 2011 Le Cri published his book EXIT PERMIT, pointing out the risks of working in the Persian Gulf and retracing Bogaert's risky but spectacular escape from Qatar.

External links
 Philippe Bogaert's blog in Qatar
www.journalism.co.uk
Flemish news for expats
The independent 13 June 2009

References

Belgian television producers
Living people
Year of birth missing (living people)